Pugh Island is an inhabited private Baffin Island offshore island located in the Arctic Archipelago in the territory of Nunavut. Islands in the immediate vicinity include Pike and Fletcher Islands to the east.

References 

Uninhabited islands of Qikiqtaaluk Region
Islands of Frobisher Bay